The 2020 Campeonato Brasileiro Série A (officially the Brasileirão Assaí 2020 for sponsorship reasons) was the 64th season of the Campeonato Brasileiro Série A, the top level of professional football in Brazil, and the 17th edition in a double round-robin since its establishment in 2003. The competition was originally scheduled to begin on 3 May and end on 6 December, however due to the COVID-19 pandemic the tournament was rescheduled, starting on 8 August 2020 and ending on 25 February 2021.

The top six teams as well as the 2020 Copa do Brasil champions qualified for the Copa Libertadores. The next six best-placed teams not qualified for Copa Libertadores qualified for the Copa Sudamericana and the last four were relegated to Série B for 2021. The match ball for the 2020 season was the Nike Merlin CBF 2020, which was presented by the Brazilian Football Confederation on 31 January 2020. Flamengo were the defending champions and successfully defended their title, winning their eighth championship on the last day of the season despite losing 2–1 to São Paulo, after Internacional drew with Corinthians at home by a 0–0 score.

Teams

Twenty teams competed in the league – the top sixteen teams from the previous season, as well as four teams promoted from the Série B.

Red Bull Bragantino became the first club to be promoted, assured of a return to the top flight after 22 years of absence following a 3–1 win against Guarani on 5 November 2019. 

Sport was promoted on 20 November,  making an immediate return to the first division after a season away.

The final two teams to be promoted were Coritiba and Atlético Goianiense, on 30 November, both returning after a two-year absence.

Number of teams by state

Stadiums and locations

Personnel and kits

Foreign players
The clubs can have a maximum of five foreign players in their Campeonato Brasileiro squads per match, but there is no limit of foreigners in the clubs' squads.

(dn) = Player holding Brazilian dual nationality.

Managerial changes

Standings

League table

Positions by round
The table lists the positions of teams after each week of matches.In order to preserve chronological evolvements, any postponed matches are not included to the round at which they were originally scheduled, but added to the full round they were played immediately afterwards.

Results

Season statistics

Top scorers

Source: Soccerway

Assists

Source: Soccerway

Clean sheets

Source: FBref.com

Awards

Monthly awards

Annual awards

References 

2020 in Brazilian football
2021 in Brazilian football
Brazil
Campeonato Brasileiro Série A seasons
Campeonato Brasileiro Série A